Dawn Plitzuweit ( born October 31, 1972) is an American basketball coach, currently the head women's basketball coach at the University of Minnesota.

Playing career

Michigan Tech statistics
Plitzuweit attended Michigan Tech between 1990–1995, but did not play basketball 1991–1992. In her freshman year she started all 29 games. Her sophomore year, 1992–1993, played in all 33 games leading Michigan Tech to a record of 30–3 scoring 12.4 points a game, 2nd on the team. Her Junior year she, once again, played in all 28 games. Her senior year she played in 29 of the 30 games that year and would finish her career with a playing record of 99–22.

Source:

Early coaching career
Plitzuweit started her career at her Alma mater, Michigan Tech, under her collegiate coach Kevin Borseth, and would continue to coach with him at Green Bay and then Michigan.

Grand Valley State
Over her career five year career at Grand Valley State, Plitzuweit reached the NCAA Division II Tournament four of the five years. In 2006, Grand Valley State, with a record of 33–3, won the 2006 NCAA Division II Tournament over American International College 58–52.

Northern Kentucky
Left Michigan at the end of the 2012 season and accepted the head coaching job at Northern Kentucky. Northern Kentucky would go on to reach the WBI in all four years making it to the second round only once.

South Dakota
On April 22, 2016, Plitzuweit became the South Dakota head coach.  During her tenure, she led the team to an 158–36 overall record, tallying an 83–10 mark in conference play.  Coach Plitzuweit led the Coyotes to three Summit League regular season titles, three consecutive Summit League Tournament Championships, and four straight NCAA tournament appearances including a trip to the Sweet 16 in 2022.  Plitzuweit was selected as Summit League coach of the year 3 times in her tenure with the Coyotes. At the conclusion of her final season with the Coyotes, Plitzuweit was named the Kay Yow National Coach of the Year.

West Virginia
On March 31, 2022, Plitzuweit was hired as the head women's basketball coach at West Virginia University.

Minnesota
On March 18, 2023, Plitzuweit was hired as the head women's basketball coach at the University of Minnesota, on a six-year contract.

Personal life
Dawn is married and has a son and daughter.

Coaching Record

References 

1972 births
Living people
People from West Bend, Wisconsin
Sportspeople from the Milwaukee metropolitan area
Basketball players from Wisconsin
American women's basketball players
Michigan Tech Huskies women's basketball players
American women's basketball coaches
Michigan Tech Huskies women's basketball coaches
Green Bay Phoenix women's basketball coaches
Michigan Wolverines women's basketball coaches
Northern Kentucky Norse women's basketball coaches
South Dakota Coyotes women's basketball coaches
West Virginia Mountaineers women's basketball coaches
Grand Valley State Lakers women's basketball coaches